Fugay (English: Balloons) is a 2017 Marathi language film. It is directed by Swapna Waghmare Joshi and stars Swwapnil Joshi and Subodh Bhave in lead roles. Movie will have its theatrical release on 10 February 2017.

Synopsis
Fugay is a story of two best friends which has been played by Swwapnil Joshi and Subodh Bhave.

Cast
Swapnil Joshi as Aditya/Adya
Subodh Bhave as Hrishikesh/Hrushya
Prarthana Behere as Jaai
Neetha Shetty as Kamini
Mohan Joshi
Anand Ingle as Daji
Suhas Joshi
Nishikant Kamat as Bairappa

Release
Fugay had its theatrical release on 10 February 2017 with English subtitles in Maharashtra, Gujarat, Goa, Madhya Pradesh and Karnataka.

Box office
Film has total collected .

Soundtrack

The songs for the film are composed by various artists like Amitraj, Nilesh Moharir and Rochak Kohli and lyrics written by Kshitij Patwardhan and Mandar Cholkar.

References

External links

2017 films
Indian comedy films
2010s Marathi-language films
2017 comedy films
Films directed by Swapna Waghmare Joshi